Ajattara is a sextet black metal band from Helsinki, Finland led by Pasi Koskinen (ex Amorphis). They formed in 1996, split up in 2012, and reformed in 2016. They were signed to Spinefarm Records and have released eight albums, their most recent being Lupaus, which was released in May 2017.

History
Ajattara formed in 1996 as a side project of Amorphis singer Pasi Koskinen. Their first release was a demo tape entitled Helvetissä on syntisen taivas which was released in 1998. The band then signed to Spikefarm Records and went on to release three albums - Itse in 2001, Kuolema in 2003 and Tyhjyys in 2004. These albums were met with largely good reviews. Ajattara released the Christmas singles "Ilon juhla" in November 2004 and "Joulu" in November 2005. The band then went on to release another album in 2006, entitled Äpäre, which was met with similar reviews as their last three albums. The band continued with the Christmas single tradition of 2004 and 2005 by releasing a single entitled Sika in 2006.

The band entered the studio on 1 June 2007 to begin recording on the album Kalmanto which was released on 5 September 2007. However, this album was not met with such good reviews as Ajattara's other albums, as some critics said the album sounded chaotic and forced. In April 2009 Ajattara released their sixth album entitled Noitumaa, this time being an all-acoustic album, which received clearly better reviews than the previous release. In 2011 the band released their seventh studio album Murhat.

The band made an announcement on its Facebook page on 15 April 2012 that it had split up for reasons unknown.

On 23 March 2016 the band made an announcement on their Facebook page that they will be playing at the Norwegian Blastfest in February 2017. Shortly after, on 9 May 2016, Pasi Koskinen announced the reunion of the band, announcing further live dates including Nummirock 2016 in Finland and Satan's Convention 2017 in Germany.
In May 2017 the band released Lupaus, their eighth studio album and first since their reformation.

Musical style
Ajattara combine elements of black metal to produce a style of black metal not dissimilar to Celtic Frost, and to a lesser extent Samael. The combined use of synthesisers and heavy guitar sounds give Ajattara a distinct sound. The lyrical themes of Ajattara usually deal with death, evil and paganism.

Line-up

Current members
 Ruoja ― lead vocals (1996-2012, 2016-present) rhythm guitar (1996-2009); studio keyboards (1996-2004)
 Kalmos (Vesa Wahlroos) ― lead guitar, backing vocals (2006-2012, 2016-present)
 Tohtori Kuolio ― bass guitar, backing vocals (2007-2012, 2016-present)
 Raajat (Janne Immonen) ― keyboards, backing vocals (2007-2012, 2016-present)
 Tartunta (Mynni Luukkainen) ― rhythm guitar (2009-2012, 2016-present)
 Malakias 6,8 (Rainer Tuomikanto) ― drums (2011-2012, 2016-present)

Session member
Lempo (Iiro Illman) ― guitar (2018-)

Former members

Guitar
 Ismonster (Ismo Liljelund) - ?
 Samuel Lempo (Tomi Koivusaari) - (2005-2006)

Bass
 Atoni (Toni Laroma) - (1996-2007)

Keyboards
 Ikkala (Jarmo Ikala) - ?
 Akir Kalmo (Aki Räty) - ?
 Irstas (Kalle Sundström) - (2004-2007)

Drums
 Orpo (Pekka Kasari) - ? 
 Malakias I (Pekka Sauvolainen) - (1996-2003)
 Malakias II (Jan Rechberger) - (2003-2004)
 Malakias III (Atte Sarkima) - (2004-2007)
 Malakias IV (Tonmi Lillman) - (2007–2011) † (died in 2012)

Timeline

Discography
Studio albums
 Itse (2001)
 Kuolema (2003)
 Tyhjyys (2004)
 Äpäre (2006)
 Kalmanto (2007)
 Noitumaa (2009)
 Murhat (2011)
 Lupaus (2017)

Compilation albums
 Joululevy (2009)

Demo albums
 Helvetissä on syntisen taivas (1998)

Singles
 "Ilon juhla" (2004)
 "Joulu" (2005)
 "Sika" (2006)
 "Tulppaani" (2007)

References

External links
 Ajattara's official website
 Ajattara's page on Spinefarm Records
 Ajattara's page on MySpace
 Ajattara's page on the Encyclopedia Metallum
 Ajattara's page at Last.fm
 Ajattara at Metal From Finland

Finnish black metal musical groups
Musical groups from Helsinki
Musical groups established in 1996
Musical quintets